A nursing chair is a chair that's comfortable when nursing an infant.

In Victorian times the nursing chair was a low seated partially upholstered chair.  Nursing included caring for children as well as breastfeeding. The low seat of the chair allowed the mother, who would have been wearing a stiff corset, to interact with small children without bending over. This chair form was particularly popular in England and found primarily in upper class homes. The types of wood most frequently used were oak, rosewood or walnut.  The seat was often sprung and could be button decorated or adorned with a circumferential braid or pair of braids. The chair legs were frequently of a cabriole style or a straight-legged spindle design.

More modern nursing chairs exist in a wider variety; either rocking chairs, recliners or gliders. They can be accompanied by ottomans.

Notes and references

Breastfeeding
Chairs